The International Human Frontier Science Program Organization (HFSPO) is a non-profit organization, based in Strasbourg,  France, that funds basic research in life sciences. The organization implements the Human Frontier Science Program (HFSP) and is supported by 14 countries and the European Commission. Shigekazu Nagata is the HFSPO President and Chair of the Board of Trustees since 2018.

History
In 1986 a feasibility study was carried out by leading Japanese scientists under the auspices of the Japanese Prime Minister's Council for Science of Technology, to explore possible means to encourage international collaboration in basic research.  Discussion was expanded to include scientists from the G7 summit nations and the European Union, resulting in the "London Wise Men's Conference" in April 1987, which endorsed the suggestion.  Prime Minister Yasuhiro Nakasone of Japan proposed the Human Frontier Science Program at the Venice Economic Summit in June 1987. The Economic Summit partners and the Chairman of the European Community welcomed the initiative and activities aimed at implementing it were started.  The implementing body, the International Human Frontier Science Program Organization (HFSPO) was established in 1989 and the secretariat was founded in Strasbourg, France. Since 1990, more than 7000 awards have been made to researchers from over 70 countries.   Of these, 28 HFSP awardees have gone on to win the Nobel Prize for their scientific work.

Funding

HFSPO receives financial support from the governments or research councils of Australia, Canada, France, Germany, India, Israel, Italy, Japan, Republic of Korea, New Zealand, Singapore, Switzerland, UK, USA, as well as from the European Commission which contributes on behalf of the non-G7 EU members. The funds are combined into a single budget and are allocated to support research fellowships and grants on the basis of HFSPO's own peer review system on the sole basis of scientific excellence.

Funding programs
Research Grants are awarded for novel collaborations involving extensive collaboration among teams of scientists working in different countries and in different disciplines. Two types of grants are available: Research Grants - Early Career and Research Grants - Program .

Postdoctoral Fellowships are available for scientists who wish to work in foreign laboratories, with emphasis on individuals early in their careers who wish to obtain training in a different field of research. Fellows can use the fellowships to  return to their home countries to start their independent research laboratory.

Cross-Disciplinary fellowships are intended for postdoctoral fellows with a Ph.D. degree in the physical sciences, chemistry, mathematics, engineering and computer sciences who wish to receive training in biology.

HFSP funding programs start at the postdoctoral level. No support is available for undergraduate or PhD students.

HFSP peer review
International peer review is a cornerstone of the procedures used in making awards. There is one review committee for Fellowships and one for Research Grants each consisting of 24 to 26 scientists. They have a broad international representation of scientific experts and each reviews applications in all scientific fields supported by the HFSP. This ensures that awards are made according to international scientific standards and the presence of reviewers from many countries minimizes geo-political bias. Extensive research is carried out into the expertise and reputation of potential members before appointment to ensure maintenance of the highest standards. The evaluation procedures are under constant review and the HFSP secretariat works closely with the members of the review committees and the Council of Scientists to ensure that all applications are assessed fairly and thoroughly.

HFSP Nakasone Award
In 2010, HFSP established the HFSP Nakasone Award to honour former Prime Minister Yasuhiro Nakasone of Japan for his vision in launching HFSP as a program of support for international collaboration and to foster early career scientists in a global context.  The HFSP Nakasone Award is designed to recognise scientists who have undertaken frontier-moving research, including technological breakthroughs, which has advanced biological research. Both senior and junior scientists are eligible and peer-recognised excellence is the major criterion.  The award can be made to an individual or a team of scientists.  Award winners receive an unrestricted research grant of USD 10,000, a medal and personalised certificate. The award ceremony is held at the annual HFSP Awardees Meeting where the award winners are expected to deliver the HFSP Nakasone Lecture.

Recipients of the Award:
 2010 Karl Deisseroth (Stanford University, USA), "for his pioneering work on the development of optogenetic methods for studying the function of neuronal networks underlying behavior".
 2011 Michael Elowitz (California Institute of Technology, USA), "for his pioneering work on gene expression noise".
 2012 Gina G. Turrigiano (Brandeis University, USA), "for her pioneering work on homeostatic plasticity in the nervous system"
 2013 Stephen Quake (Stanford University, USA), "for his pioneering work that advanced biological measuring techniques".
 2014 Uri Alon (Weizmann Institute of Science, Rehovot, Israel), "for his pioneering work in discovering network motifs".
 2015 James J. Collins (Center of Synthetic Biology of Boston University, USA), "for his innovative work on synthetic gene networks and programmable cells".
 2016 Emmanuelle Charpentier (Max Planck Institute for Infection Biology, Berlin, Germany) and Jennifer Doudna ( University of California, Berkeley, USA), "for their seminal work on the CRISPR-Cas9 system".
 2017 David Julius (University of California, San Francisco, USA), "for his discovery of the molecular mechanism of thermal sensing in animals".
 2018 Svante Pääbo (Max Planck Institute for Evolutionary Anthropology, Leipzig, Germany), "for his discovery of the extent to which hybridization with Neanderthals and Denisovans has shaped the evolution of modern humans".
 2019 Michael N. Hall (Biozentrum University of Basel, Switzerland), " for the 'discovery of the master regulator of cell growth, the target of rapamycin (TOR) kinase".
 2020 Angelika Amon (Koch Institute of Integrative Cancer Research at MIT, Cambridge, USA), for 'discovering aneuploidy-induced cellular changes and their contribution to tumorigenesis.'
 2021 Anthony Hyman (Max Planck Institute of Molecular Cell Biology and Genetics, Dresden, Germany) and Clifford Brangwynne (Princeton University and the Howard Hughes Medical Institute, USA), for their 'discovery of a new state of biological matter, phase-separated macromolecule condensates, that play an important role in cell organisation, gene regulation, signalling and pathology.'

HFSP Journal
Launched in October 2006, the HFSP Journal aims to foster communication between scientists publishing high quality, innovative research at the frontiers of the life sciences. Peer review is designed to allow for the unique requirements of such papers and is overseen by an Editorial Board with members from different disciplines. The HFSP Journal offers its authors the option to pay a fee to make their research articles Open Access immediately upon publication. For other articles, access is limited to subscribers for the first 6 months after publication, but access is free thereafter.

The HFSP Journal ceased publication in July 2010 and was bought by the scientific publisher Taylor & Frances, to be re-launched in 2011 as “Frontiers in Life Science.

In 2015 the HFSP reported that the former journal name had been hijacked in an apparent attempt to fraud researchers into publishing an apparent scam journal.

References

Further reading

External links
 

Organizations based in Strasbourg
Science and technology in Europe
Biotechnology organizations
Organizations established in 1989
Biomedical research foundations
Medical and health foundations
Medical and health organizations based in France
Fellowships